Richard "Richie" Corner (born 20 April 1962) is a former professional English darts player who plays in Professional Darts Corporation events.

Originally a poultry farmer from North Yorkshire, he has played darts since 2007, mainly in the lower levels of the PDC.

He won two Challenge Tour events in 2015.

References

External links
Profile and stats on Darts Database

1962 births
Living people
English darts players
Sportspeople from York
Professional Darts Corporation former tour card holders